Bake is the verb form of baking, a method of preparing food. It may also refer to:


People
 Bake (surname)
 Bake McBride (born 1949), American baseball player
 Bake Turner (born 1940), American Football League and National Football League player
 Valentine Baker (1888–1942), nicknamed "Bake," British First World War fighter pilot and co-founder of the Martin-Baker Aircraft Company

Places
 Bake, Chongqing, People's Republic of China, a town
 Bake, Cornwall, England, a hamlet
 Bake Fishing Lakes, also known as Bake Lakes, Cornwall

Other uses
 Casserole, also referred to as a "bake" in British English
 Bloggers Association of Kenya, community organization of bloggers in Kenya
 Caching the results of a computer graphics calculation in a Texture map or Vertex attributes

See also
 Bäke (disambiguation)
 Fried bake, a flour-based product
 David Baker (poker player, born 1986), American professional poker player nicknamed "Bakes"

Lists of people by nickname